Randolph Township is one of the eighteen townships of Portage County, Ohio, United States.  The 2000 census found 5,504 people in the township.

Geography
Located in the southern part of the county, it borders the following townships:
Rootstown Township - north
Edinburg Township - northeast corner
Atwater Township - east
Marlboro Township, Stark County - south
Lake Township, Stark County - southwest
Suffield Township - west
Brimfield Township - northwest corner

No municipalities are located in Randolph Township, though the unincorporated community of Saint Joseph is located in the far western edge of the township.

Formed from the Connecticut Western Reserve, Randolph Township covers an area of 25 sq mi.

Name and history
Randolph Township was named in honor of Randolph Storrs, the son of a pioneer settler.

It is the only Randolph Township statewide.

Government
The township is governed by a three-member board of trustees, who are elected in November of odd-numbered years to a four-year term beginning on the following January 1. Two are elected in the year after the presidential election and one is elected in the year before it. There is also an elected township fiscal officer, who serves a four-year term beginning on April 1 of the year after the election, which is held in November of the year before the presidential election. Vacancies in the fiscal officership or on the board of trustees are filled by the remaining trustees.

Randolph has a public library, a branch of the Portage County District Library.

Fairgrounds
Randolph is home to the Portage County fairgrounds and the annual Portage County-Randolph Fair each August.  The fair celebrated its 150th anniversary in 2008.

References

External links
County website

Townships in Portage County, Ohio
Townships in Ohio